Daniel Barker may refer to:

Danny Barker (1909–1994), American jazz musician
Daniel Barker (politician) in 63rd New York State Legislature
Dan Barker (born 1949), American atheist activist
Daniel Barker (footballer) (born 1987), British footballer, international for the British Virgin Islands